John Louis Clement (October 31, 1919 - December 11, 1969) was an American football player.  As of 2022, he is the only Pittsburgh Steelers player to wear 0. He was also an officer in the U.S. Army Air Corps during World War II.

References
 http://www.post-gazette.com/steelers/questions/20020501steelerqa.asp

External links

1919 births
1969 deaths
American football halfbacks
SMU Mustangs football players
Chicago Cardinals players
Pittsburgh Steelers players
Chicago Hornets players
United States Army Air Forces officers
United States Army Air Forces personnel of World War II
Year of death unknown
Military personnel from Oklahoma
Players of American football from Oklahoma